Trichocephalus is a genus of flowering plants belonging to the family Rhamnaceae. Its native range is South Africa.

References

Rhamnaceae
Rhamnaceae genera
Taxa named by Adolphe-Théodore Brongniart